Summernights (released in some countries as: Golden Girls) is a 1977 album by German euro-disco group Silver Convention, which at the time consisted of vocalists Penny McLean, Ramona Wolf and Rhonda Heath, along with producer-songwriters Michael Kunze (aka Stephan Prager) and Sylvester Levay.

Track listing 
All tracks written by Michael Kunze and Sylvester Levay

Standard release 
Side one
 "Summernights" - 3:58
 "Wolfchild" - 4:20
 "Hotshot" - 5:57
 "Voodoo Woman" - 4:00
Side two
 "Telegram" - 5:29
 "Ain't It Like A Hollywood Movie" - 5:06
 "Save Me '77" - 3:11
 "Blame It On The Music" - 4:27
 "Disco Ball" - 3:10

US release (Golden Girls) 
Side one
 "Hollywood Movie" – 5:06
 Alternative title for "Ain't It Like a Hollywood Movie"
 "Blame It On The Music" - 4:27
 "Save Me '77" - 3:11
 "Disco Ball" - 3:10
 "Telegram" - 5:29
Side two
 "Summernights" - 3:58
 "Wolfchild" - 4:20
 "Hotshot" - 5:57
 "Voodoo Woman" - 4:00

Charts

References 

1976 albums
Silver Convention albums